Edward Angus Hamilton (born 27 February 1831) was an architect and politician in colonial South Australia.

Hamilton was the son of George Ernest Hamilton, a civil engineer, and arrived in South Australia on 5 December 1849. In April 1852 he began Government service at the Assay Office, where remained until June 1853. Hamilton was then appointed Assistant to the Colonial Architect of South Australia, William Bennett Hays. By January 1854 he had been appointed Assistant Architect in the Colonial Architect's Office. When Hays left for England towards the end of 1854, Hamilton was placed in charge. On 10 July 1856 Hamilton was appointed Colonial Architect and Supervisor of Works with a salary of £450 per annum and a £112 gratuity.

Hamilton married Ellen Seymour in 1856. He resigned as Colonial Architect around August 1860.

Hamilton and his father were involved in constructing the Kadina to Wallaroo railway, completed in 1866. Their partnership was dissolved later in 1866 when George was appointed to the Strathalbyn and Middleton Railway and Edward joined the architectural firm of Wright & Woods, which he left in 1868 to become second-in-charge of the Colonial Architect's Department.

Hamilton  was elected a member of the South Australian House of Assembly for the District of Light on 5 April 1870, served as Treasurer of South Australia from 12 May 1870 to 30 May 1870 and resigned a year later, unmourned, on 28 July 1871, and reportedly left the colony for South America.

Works
Hamilton designed the present (Anglican) St George's Church in Gawler in Early English style. The foundation stone was laid on 6 January 1858 but the building was not consecrated until 23 April 1895 (by Bishop Kennion), initially due to the church trustees not accepting the Model Trust Deed.

References

1831 births
Members of the South Australian House of Assembly
Year of death missing
South Australian architects
Adelaide Club
Treasurers of South Australia